Michael Corr (born September 15, 1965) is an American politician who served in the Pennsylvania House of Representatives from the 150th district from 2017 to 2019.

On May 30, 2018, he announced he wouldn't run for reelection to a second term.

References

1965 births
Living people
Republican Party members of the Pennsylvania House of Representatives